Roisel is a commune in the Somme department in Hauts-de-France in northern France.

Geography

Population

History
The name of Roisel has an etymology close to that of "roseau" (en:reed) and it's possible, given the ponds, lakes and marches, that the commune takes its name from the landscape.
Roisel has strong connections with Saint Fursey.

Places of interest
 St Martin's church. Destroyed during World War I, it was rebuilt by local architect Louis Faille, from Nurlu, soon after 1928
 The town hall (Hotel de ville), rebuilt in 1926 by Maurice Lucet].

See also
Communes of the Somme department

References

Communes of Somme (department)